The 2021–22 National League season, known as the Vanarama National League for sponsorship reasons, was the seventh season as English football's National League, the nineteenth season consisting of three divisions, and the forty-third season overall.

Due to the curtailment of the preceding season for North and South and lower levels of competition in the English football pyramid, promotion and relegation between levels 5 and 6, and between level 6 and lower levels were suspended. These, combined with the folding of Macclesfield Town in 2020–21 and the knock-on effects of Bury's collapse in 2019–20, meant that for the 2021–22 season the three divisions had the irregular complement of 23, 22 and 21 teams, respectively.

In 2019, prior to these COVID-19 related impacts, the league had intended the 2021–22 season to be the first using a new structure in which the number of teams in its North and South divisions would increase, resulting in three 24-team divisions. On 1 July 2021, the National League confirmed its intent to achieve this structure for the 2022–23 season; consequently the following adjustments to promotion and relegation are in effect for this season:
 As before, two teams will be promoted from the National League to League Two and replaced by two teams relegated from it;
 Three teams were relegated from the National League to the two level 6 divisions, and replaced by four teams (two from each of the National League North and South); and
 Two teams were relegated from the two level 6 divisions (one from the National League North and one from the National League South) to the premier divisions of the Northern Premier League, Southern League Central or South, or Isthmian League, and replaced by eight teams (two from each division). The Football Association already clarified these relegations by November.

National League

Promotion and relegation

Team changes

To National League
Promoted from 2020–21 National League North
 None

Promoted from 2020–21 National League South
 None

Relegated from 2020–21 League Two
 Southend United
 Grimsby Town

From National League
Promoted to 2021–22 League Two
 Sutton United
 Hartlepool United

Relegated to 2021–22 National League North
 None

Relegated to 2021–22 National League South
 None 

Grimsby Town became the first former top-flight First Division club to be relegated to the National League twice, and their matches against Notts County make them the second pairing of clubs to face each other across all top five tiers of English football (after the Luton Town vs Oxford United fixture).

Stadia and locations

Personnel and sponsoring

Managerial changes

National League table

Results table

Play-offs

Quarter-finals

Semi-finals

Final

Top scorers

Hat-tricks

Notes
5 Player scored 5 goals

Monthly awards

Each month the Vanarama National League announces their official Player of the Month and Manager of the Month.

National League North

The National League North consisted of 22 teams for the final time.

Team changes
Following the COVID-19 pandemic-related cancellation of the four Step 3 leagues' 2020–21 seasons, no teams were promoted to or relegated from the National League North.

To National League North
Relegated from 2020–21 National League
 None

From National League North
Promoted to 2021–22 National League
 None

Stadia and locations

Managerial changes

National League North table

Results table

Play-offs

Quarter-finals

Semi-finals

Final

Top scorers

Hat-tricks

Monthly awards

Each month the Vanarama National League announces their official Player of the Month and Manager of the Month.

National League South

The National League South consisted of 21 teams after the 2019–20 season and did so for the final time.

Team changes
Following the COVID-19 pandemic-related cancellation of the four Step 3 leagues' 2020–21 seasons, no teams were promoted to or relegated from the National League South.

To National League South
Relegated from 2020–21 National League
 None

From National League South
Promoted to 2021–22 National League
 None

Stadia and locations

Managerial changes

National League South table

Results table

Play-offs

Quarter-finals

Semi-finals

Final

Top scorers

Hat-tricks

Notes
4 Player scored 4 goals

Monthly awards

Each month the Vanarama National League announces their official Player of the Month and Manager of the Month.

References 

2021–22 National League
5
Eng
Eng